The 1954 Giro d'Italia was the 37th edition of the Giro d'Italia, one of cycling's Grand Tours. The Giro started off in Palermo on 21 May with a  team time trial and concluded in Milan with a  relatively flat mass-start stage on 13 June. Fifteen teams entered the race, which was won by Swiss Carlo Clerici of the Welter team. Second and third respectively were Swiss rider Hugo Koblet and Italian Nino Assirelli.

Teams

Fifteen teams were invited by the race organizers to participate in the 1954 edition of the Giro d'Italia. The organizers invited neighboring countries to gather a squad of riders to send to compete in the race. Belgium, Germany, the Netherlands, Switzerland all entered a team, while France was offered a spot in the race and accepted, but could not form a team in time. Each team sent a squad of seven riders, which meant that the race started with a peloton of 105 cyclists. From the riders that began the race, 67 made it to the finish in Milan.

The teams entering the race were:

  
  
  
 Bianchi
 
 Clement
 Doniselli-Lansetina
  
 
 Guerra
 Ideor
 
  
 
 Nivea

Pre-race favorites

Fausto Coppi (Bianchi) was seen as the clear–cut favorite, because of the strength of his supporting team. Coppi's greatest challenger was thought to be Hugo Koblet (Cilo). Koblet entered the race in what was regarded as not great form, but if he were to gain his form in the race, then his chances of victory would be large. A La Sentinelle writer felt that Koblet's presence made the competition interesting as it felt no other rider could challenge Coppi. Koblet was thought to have a better support from his team relative to the past couple of years and was expected to contend for the general classification.

Outside candidates included Fiorenzo Magni (Nivea) who would normally be considered a more legitimate contender; however, he was recovering from a fall in the one–day race Roma–Napoli–Roma. Roma-Napoli-Roma winner Bruno Monti (Arbos) and Pasquale Fornara (Bottecchia) were seen as other challengers. "Old" three–time champion Gino Bartali (Bartali) lined up to race while being supported by his usual domestiques Corrieri and Bresci. 

While noting that the Giro had been primarily won by Italian riders, Feuille d'Avis Valaisan felt the teams with Belgians, Spanish, and Swiss teams would have a good chance to rival the Italian squads. Nouvelliste Valasain writer even commented that a coalition of some sort exists between Italian riders against the foreign riders. Girardengo-Eldorado riders Stan Ockers and Rik Van Steenbergen were seen as the best Belgian entrants. Their Raymond Impanis was seen a potential threat, but due to disputes with their team director, his participation was questionable. Heinz Müller was the German Clement team's best chance. The Dutch team Locomotief was thought to be filled with good climbers and rouleurs with the likes of Wim Van Est, Wout Wagtmans, and the Voorting brothers Adrie and Gerrit. The team was expected to do well in the opening team time trial. Spanish Climber Jesus Loroño (Ideor) was seen as a contender in the mountains after his performance at the 1953 Tour de France, where he won as a stage and the Mountains classification. Bernard Ruiz and Francisco Masip were two other Spanish riders to watch. Fritz Schär (Guerra) was seen as a rider who would favor the intermediate sprints classification despite his recent poor performance at the Tour de Romandie. Carlo Clerici (Welter) was thought to have "class and will." 
 
Notable absences included Ferdinand Kübler (Fiorelli) who had an ongoing dispute with the race organizers following his abandonment of the Giro the year before. Louison Bobet (Mercier) was seen as a rider who could pose a threat to Coppi, but due to previous incidents of giving him up, he was not seen as a strong contender.

Route and stages

The route's first fourteen stages were revealed on 25 February 1954, amid speculation that Rome was not going to be included. The rest was revealed on 6 May 1954. The route included two time trials, one team and one individual. The inclusion of the team time trial was criticized as it was thought to give too much of an advantage to the wealthier teams. In addition, the team time trial that year was held midway through the race and several teams were down men through disease or abandonment, which only further hindered teams. To assuage this complaint of the teams, the team time trial stage was made first. Critics felt that the route would be similar to year's past, where all the action would be in the closing days, citing the 20th and 21st stages as being the most difficult. The press felt that the increased number of intermediate sprints would lead to more attacks throughout the stage ad help animate the race. The race started in Palermo for the first time since 1949.

Race overview
In the sixth stage, Carlo Clerici escaped and took the lead with a big margin.

In the twentieth stage, Fausto Coppi won and took some time back. His fans were hoping that he would show more action on the twenty-first stage which included the Bernina Pass, but cyclists rode slowly as a form of protest against the racing conditions, taking almost ten hours to cover the 222 km stage; this event became known as the Bernina strike. When the race ended in Milan the next day, angry supporters whistled at the cyclists. For his leading role in the strike, Coppi was given a two-months suspension, although this was later revoked.

Classification leadership

One jersey was worn during the 1954 Giro d'Italia. The leader of the general classification – calculated by adding the stage finish times of each rider – wore a pink jersey. This classification is the most important of the race, and its winner is considered as the winner of the Giro. The winner of the general classification received 72,000 francs. In total 32,555,000 lire (then roughly 227,000 Swiss francs) was awarded. Each day a rider wore the pink jersey, he would win 15,000 francs. Each stage winner received  49,000 francs. A green jersey was awarded to the best ranked foreign rider in the general classification, who also received a sum of money each day the jersey was awarded.

The mountains classification awarded all awarded three points to the first rider and one point to the second rider to cross the summit of a categorized climb. There was no leader's jersey awarded for this classification. The winner received 10,000 francs. Although no jersey was awarded, there was also a classification for the teams, in which the teams were awarded points for their rider's performance during the stages in the intermediate sprints. 

In the gran premio traguardi volanti or intermediate sprint classification points were awarded at designated sprint locations throughout each stage's route and at the stage finishes. In total there were 64 designated sprint points throughout the race. Points were awarded to the first three riders to pass through the assigned point: first received five points, second received three points, and third received one point. The winner of each sprint will receive 650 francs, while the overall classification winner received 81,000 francs. The leader of this classification wore a white jersey.

Final standings

General classification

Mountains classification

Intermediate sprints classification

Intermediate sprints team classification

Aftermath

Following the race, a Nouvelliste Valaisan writer described how non-Italian riders dominated the race by winning 11 of the 22 stage, while having 35 foreigners riding to 75 Italians starting the race. The writer acknowledged that some critics felt Italian cycling was beginning to decline as the "Big Three" Bartali, Coppi, and Magni would be soon exiting the sport; however, the writer noted that Giancarlo Astrua, Nino Defilippis, Pasquale Fornara, among others would help maintain Italian cycling's presence. In particular, the writer felt the younger riders attacked more and forced the older riders out of their reserves quicker than expected. The writer concluded that the Swiss riders have earned respect from their peers and become favorites entering races now, while stating that the Swiss riders that will contest the upcoming Tour de France will have a lengthy time off to rest before its start because of the 1954 FIFA World Cup. A Nouvelliste Valaisan writer wrote that large attacks were expected on the 21st stage which featured the Bernina pass; however, the attacks did not come, which at the time they speculated it was due to fatigue of the riders. Due to the low effort by the riders and slow stage speed, race organizers cut the prize money on the stage by half. Later this inaction by the peloton on the 21st stage became known as the "Bernina strike." Another Nouvelliste Valaisan writer described the collective performance by the Swiss riders as the best in the nation's history at the Giro, as three finished in the top 12 of the general classification.

References

Citations

1954
1954 in Italian sport
1954 in road cycling
May 1954 sports events in Europe
June 1954 sports events in Europe
1954 Challenge Desgrange-Colombo